Lighten the Dark: A Midwinter Album is the fifth album by folk band Kerfuffle.

Track listing

Personnel
Sam Sweeney (fiddle, viola, English concertina, bells, shakers)
Hannah James (accordion, vocals)
Jamie Roberts (guitar, vocals)
Tom Sweeney (bass guitar, vocals)

2009 albums